Bodiford is a surname. Notable people with the surname include:

Ray Bodiford (1936–1989), American insurance agent
Shaun Bodiford (born 1982), American football player
William Bodiford (born 1955), American professor and author